Delhi Daredevils (DD) are a cricket team based in Delhi, India. They play in the Indian Premier League (IPL), and were one of the eight teams that competed in the 2017 Indian Premier League.

Auction

The player auction for the 2017 Indian Premier League was held on 20 February in Bangalore. The Delhi Daredevils bought the following players at the auction:

Angelo Mathews
Corey Anderson
Kagiso Rabada
Pat Cummins
Ankit Bawne
Aditya Tare
M Ashwin
Navdeep Saini
Shashank Singh

In April 2017, the Daredevils also signed Australian Ben Hilfenhaus as a replacement for JP Duminy who withdrew from the season due to personal reasons. Quinton de Kock was also ruled out of the tournament in March 2017 due to an injury, but no replacement was named for him.

Squad
 Players with international caps are listed in bold.

Season standings

Matches

Statistics

References

External links
IPL team Delhi Daredevils web page on official IPL T20 website - IPLT20.com
The Official Delhi Daredevils Site

Delhi Capitals seasons
2017 Indian Premier League